Emmanuel Laroche (11 July 1914 – 16 June 1991) was a French linguist and Hittitologist. An expert in the languages of ancient Anatolia (Indo-European and Hurrian), he was professor of Anatolian studies at the Collège de France (1973–1985).

Main works 
Hieroglyphic writings
 Les Hiéroglyphes hittites (1960, réed. 1976)
Hittite and Louvite texte
 Études proto-hittites (1947)
 Dictionnaire de la langue louvite (1959)
 Glossaire de la langue hourrite' (1976)
 Catalogue des textes hittites (1971)
History and geography of ancient Anatoly
 Recueil d'onomastique hittite (1951)
 Le Rôle des Hittites dans l'Orient ancien (1956)
 Les Noms des Hittites (1966)
Hittite religion
 Recherches sur les noms des dieux hittites (1947)
 Le Panthéon de Yazilikaya, JCS 6 (1952)
 Kubaba déesse anatolienne et le problème des origines de Cybèle  La Réforme religieuse du Roi Tudhaliya IV et sa signification politique (1975)
Deciphering of the lycian language
 La Stèle trilingue du Létôon, second part: L'inscription lycienne (1979)
 Dictionnaire de la langue louvite, 1959
 Catalogue des textes Hittites, Paris 1971 
 Glossaire De La Langue Hourrite'', 1980,

External links 
 Emmanuel Laroche on data.bnf.fr

People from Clamart
1914 births
1991 deaths
Academic staff of the Collège de France
Academic staff of the École pratique des hautes études
Linguists from France
Linguists of Indo-European languages
French Assyriologists
École Normale Supérieure alumni
Members of the Austrian Academy of Sciences
20th-century linguists
Assyriologists